Crushed may refer to:

 "Crushed" (Ms. Marvel), a 2022 episode of the American television series Ms. Marvel
 "Crushed" (Roland Lee Gift song) a 2009 single by Roland Lee Gift
 "Crushed" (The Suite Life of Zack & Cody episode), an episode of the television show The Suite Life of Zack & Cody
 "Crushed", a song by Dala from the 2009 album Everyone Is Someone
 "Crushed", a song by Eighteen Visions from the 2004 album Obsession
 "Crushed", a song by Imagine Dragons from the 2022 album Mercury – Acts 1 & 2
 "Crushed", a song by Limp Bizkit from the 1999 soundtrack album End of Days
 "Crushed", a song by Parkway Drive from the 2015 album Ire
 "Crushed", a song by Rosette Sharma

See also
 Crush (disambiguation)
 Crusher (disambiguation)